Onur Ağaoğlu (born June 15, 1990) is a Turkish architect, author, musician, and businessperson.

Early life and education
Ağaoğlu was born in Istanbul. He is a graduate of Yeditepe University, Istanbul (2011). He completed his MBA at Bilgi University in 2015. During his university years, he  engaged in organic farming business.

Career
While still in the university, Ağaoğlu established a shooting company called Skyfilm with a friend. He served as a cinematographer and the director of the firm. He created a music clip called Black Life and various YouTube videos.

After graduating from university, Ağaoğlu worked with Maslak 1453 for some years. He later launched the Ağaoğlu Concept brand. He founded the  Agaoglu’s Group of Companies, a Turkish-based construction firm. He  is a member of board of directors for the company. He also assisted in the launching of  brands such as Self Park Car Park Solutions, Onurvinc Crane Solutions, Agavinc Crane Rent Solutions, and Skyfilm Aerial Film Solutions.

Ağaoğlu  supports non-governmental organizations and  also engages in social responsibility projects across Turkey.

Books
Ağaoğlu  has written and published  two books:
 Entrepreneur: What I Want To Be 
 The Meaning of Life.

References

External links
 Agaoglu’s Group of Companies website

Living people
1990 births
Turkish writers
Turkish architects
Turkish businesspeople
Turkish musicians